Mark De Bie (born 5 February 1939 in Aalst, Belgium) is a retired Belgian television writer.

He has written Belgian TV series such as Alfa Papa Tango in 1990 which he co-wrote with Guy Bernaert.

He is also credited with acting in the TV series Paradijsvogels, De in 1979, portraying a doctor.

Television filmography
Alfa Papa Tango (1990) TV Series (writer)
Paradijsvogels, De (1979) TV Series (screenplay)
Dag dat het kampioenschap van België verreden werd, De (1978) (TV)

External links
 

Flemish television writers
Male television writers
1939 births
Living people
People from Aalst, Belgium
Belgian male writers